Ceraturgus is a genus of robber flies in the family Asilidae. There are about 11 described species in Ceraturgus.

Species
 Ceraturgus aurulentus (Fabricius, 1805)
 Ceraturgus cornutus (Wiedemann, 1828)
 Ceraturgus cruciatus (Say, 1823)
 Ceraturgus elizabethae Brimley, 1924
 Ceraturgus fasciatus (Say, 1823)
 Ceraturgus johnsoni Martin, 1965
 Ceraturgus mabelae Brimley, 1924
 Ceraturgus mitchelli Brimley, 1924
 Ceraturgus nigripes Williston, 1886
 Ceraturgus oklahomensis (Bromley, 1934)
 Ceraturgus similis Johnson, 1912

References

Further reading

External links

 

Asilidae
Asilidae genera